Spatalistis tyrophthora is a species of moth of the family Tortricidae. It is found in India (Assam).

The wingspan is 12–13 mm. The forewings are pale leaden-grey or rather dark grey, with three broad oblique obscure brownish fasciae sprinkled and strigulated with black. The costa is suffused with whitish-ochreous. The hindwings are dark fuscous. Adults have been recorded on wing in November.

References

Moths described in 1912
tyrophthora